Riyadh Governorate is one of the 22 governorates (muhafzah) of Riyadh Province that contains the city of Riyadh, capital of Saudi Arabia alongside five other towns and neighborhoods. It shares borders with the Rumah governorate to the north, al-Kharj governorate to the south, Huraymila, Thadiq, Diriyah and Durumah governorates to the west and Eastern Province's Al Ahsa governorate to the east.

Administrative divisions 

 Riyadh (seat)
 Irqah
 Hayir
 Heet
 Banban
 Amajiyah

References 

Populated places in Riyadh Province
Governorates of Saudi Arabia